Two ships in the United States Navy have been named USS Sigourney for James Butler Sigourney.

 The first  was a Wickes-class destroyer from 1918, and was later transferred to the Royal Navy as HMS Newport.
 The second  was a Fletcher-class destroyer from 1943 to 1960.

United States Navy ship names